Fritz Naef (June 5, 1934 – July 27, 2014) was a Swiss former ice hockey player who competed for the Swiss national team at the 1956 Winter Olympics in Cortina d'Ampezzo.

Professional career
Naef joined the National League A in 1949 and played his entire career in Switzerland:

 HC Davos 1949–1954
 HC Lausanne 1954–1959
 HC Servette (later as HC Genève-Servette) 1959–1969

International career
Naef appeared in 4 World Championship and at one Olympics.

Retirement
Naed's number was retired on the 25 September 2004 and died in 2014.

References

External links

1934 births
2014 deaths
Genève-Servette HC players
HC Davos players
Ice hockey players at the 1956 Winter Olympics
Lausanne HC players
Olympic ice hockey players of Switzerland
Swiss ice hockey right wingers